This is list of schools in Israel.

Israel
 
Schools
Schools
Schools
Israel